The Rocheport Interstate 70 Bridge is a four-lane continuous truss bridge over the Missouri River on Interstate 70 (I-70) between Cooper and Boone counties near Rocheport.

The bridge was built in 1960 and rehabilitated in 1994.

In 2019, the Missouri Department of Transportation received a $81.2 million federal INFRA grant which provided the remaining necessary funding to replace the aging bridge. On July 1, 2021, MoDOT selected the Lunda Team as the design-build contractor for the project. The design includes two bridges (one for each direction of travel); each bridge will accommodate three travel lanes and full-width shoulders. Construction on the first bridge began in October 2021. The first is scheduled to be done in 2023. The second will be done afterwards. The entire project is scheduled to be completed by the end of 2024.

See also
 List of crossings of the Missouri River

References

 Bridgehunter.com profile

Buildings and structures in Boone County, Missouri
Buildings and structures in Cooper County, Missouri
Bridges completed in 1960
Interstate 70
Road bridges in Missouri
Bridges on the Interstate Highway System
Continuous truss bridges in the United States
1960 establishments in Missouri
Bridges over the Missouri River
Transportation in Boone County, Missouri
Transportation in Cooper County, Missouri